José Bañón Gonzálvez (19 April 1922 – 21 April 1987) was a Spanish football goalkeeper and coach.

Club career
Bañón was born in Alicante. After playing for three local amateur clubs he joined another team in the Valencian Community, Hércules CF, being part of their La Liga roster in 1941–42 but failing to make his debut in the competition.

Bañón signed for Real Madrid in the summer of 1943, being the most used player in his position during his six-season spell (maximum of 26 matches in 1944–45 and a minimum of 17 in 1947–48) and winning three major titles, including two Copa del Generalísimo trophies. He was forced to retire from football at only 27, due to a lung problem.

After retiring, Bañón returned to his native region and coached Alicante CF from 1951 to 1953, the first year being spent in Segunda División and the second as a player-coach. He was also in charge of Orihuela Deportiva CF and Elche CF, leaving the sport for good in 1956.

International career
Bañón was called up several times to the Spain national side as Ignacio Eizaguirre's backup, but only earned one cap: on 27 January 1947, he played 48 minutes in a friendly with Portugal before retiring injured in the eventual 1–4 loss in Lisbon.

Personal life / Death
Bañón's older brother, Francisco (1920–2009), was an international football referee. José died in his hometown of Alicante on 21 April 1987, just two days after his 65th birthday.

Honours

Club
Real Madrid
Copa del Generalísimo: 1946, 1947
Copa Eva Duarte: 1947

Individual
Ricardo Zamora Trophy: 1945–46

References

External links

1922 births
1987 deaths
Footballers from Alicante
Spanish footballers
Association football goalkeepers
La Liga players
Segunda División players
Tercera División players
Hércules CF players
Elche CF players
Real Madrid CF players
Alicante CF footballers
Spain international footballers
Spanish football managers
Segunda División managers
Alicante CF managers
Orihuela Deportiva CF managers
Elche CF managers